Israel Epstein (20 April 1915 – 26 May 2005) was a Polish-born Chinese journalist and author. He was one of the few foreign-born Chinese citizens of non-Chinese origin to become a member of the Chinese Communist Party.

Early life and education
Israel Epstein was born on 20 April 1915 in Warsaw to Jewish parents; at the time, Warsaw was under Imperial Russian control (now the capital of Poland). His father had been imprisoned by the authorities of czarist Russia for leading a labor uprising and his mother had been exiled to Siberia. Epstein's father was sent by his company to Japan after the outbreak of the World War I; when the German Army approached Warsaw, his mother and Epstein fled and joined him in Asia. With his family experiencing anti-Jewish sentiment in several places, in 1917, Epstein came to China with his parents at the age of two and they settled in Tianjin (formerly Tientsin) in 1920. Epstein was raised there.

Career
Israel Epstein began to work in journalism at age 15, when he wrote for the Peking and Tientsin Times, an English-language newspaper based in Tianjin. He also covered the Japanese Invasion of China for the United Press and other Western news agencies. In the autumn of 1938, he joined the China Defense League, which had been established by Soong Ching-ling, Sun Yat-sen's widow, for the purpose of publicizing and enlisting international support for the Chinese cause. In 1941, he faked news about his own death as a decoy for the Japanese who were trying to arrest him. The misinformation even found its way into a short item printed in The New York Times.

After being assigned to review one of the books of Edgar Snow, Epstein and Snow came to know each other personally and Snow showed him his classic work Red Star Over China before it was published. He was deeply influenced by the progressivism of Snow and became involved with the democratic movement in China, becoming an editor for Snow's magazine, Democracy.

In 1934, Epstein married Edith Bihovsky Epstein, later Ballin, from whom he was divorced in the early 1940s. In 1944, Epstein first visited Britain and afterwards went to live in the United States with his second wife Elsie Fairfax-Cholmeley for five years.

After escaping from an Imperial Japanese concentration camp, he worked for Allied Labor News, becoming editor-in-chief. He published his book The Unfinished Revolution in China in 1947. His book was enthusiastically reviewed in The New York Times by Owen Lattimore of Johns Hopkins University. In 1951 Communist defector Elizabeth Bentley testified to the U.S. Senate Internal Security Subcommittee, "Israel Epstein had been a member of the Russian secret police for many years in China."

Many years later, his wife, Fairfax-Cholmeley, would become known to a generation of Chinese-language students in China and around the world as a contributor to one of the most widely used Chinese-English dictionaries published in the PRC. After Fairfax-Cholmeley's death in 1984, Epstein married his third wife, Huang Huanbi.
In 1951, Soong Ching-ling invited him to return to China to edit the magazine China Reconstructs, which was later renamed China Today. He remained editor-in-chief of China Today until his retirement at age 70, and stayed on as editor emeritus. During his tenure at China Today, he became a Chinese citizen in 1957 and a member of the Chinese Communist Party in 1964. In 1955, 1965 and 1976 Epstein visited Tibet, and based on these three visits in 1983 published the book Tibet Transformed.

Imprisonment
Epstein was imprisoned twice, separately by the Empire of Japan and later by the People's Republic of China.

He was placed in a concentration camp by Imperial Japanese authorities following the attack on Pearl Harbor in 1941. He escaped along with some of the other prisoners.

During the Cultural Revolution, on charges of plotting against Zhou Enlai, he was imprisoned in 1968 in the north of Beijing in Qincheng Prison, where he was subjected to solitary confinement. In 1973, he was released, and Zhou apologized. His privileges were restored. Despite his 5 years imprisonment, he remained loyal to the ideals of Communism until his death. Israel Epstein was elected as a member of the Standing Committee of the National Committee of the Chinese People's Political Consultative Conference, an advisory body, in 1983.

Honors
During his life, Israel Epstein was honored by Chinese political leaders Zhou Enlai, Mao Zedong, Deng Xiaoping, Jiang Zemin, and Hu Jintao. His funeral was held at the Babaoshan Cemetery for Revolutionaries, in Shijingshan District, Beijing on 3 June 2005 at 09:30. The ceremony was attended by many officials, among then President Hu Jintao, Premier Wen Jiabao, as well as Politburo Standing Committee members Jia Qinglin and Li Changchun. After the service, his body was cremated.

Published works
 The People's War. [An Account of the War in China to the Fall of Hankow], V. Gollancz, 1939, 384 p.
 I Visit Yenan: Eye Witness Account of the Communist-led Liberated Areas in North-West China, People's Publishing House [Bombay], 1945, 94 pp.
 Notes on Labor Problems in Nationalist China, Garland Pub., 1980, 159 pp.
 My China Eye: Memoirs of a Jew and a Journalist, Long River Press, 2005, 358 pp.
 History Should Not be Forgotten, 五洲传播出版社, 2005, 286 pp.

First published in English
 The Unfinished Revolution in China, Little Brown and Company (1947), hardcover, 442 pp.

Published in Chinese, translated into English
 From Opium War to Liberation, New World Press (Beijing, 1956), hardcover, 146 pp.
 Tibet Transformed, New World Press (Beijing, 1983), trade paperback, 563 pp, 
 Woman in World History:  Soong Ching Ling, New World Press (Beijing, 1993), hardcover,

See also
Rewi Alley
Sidney Rittenberg
Sidney Shapiro
Jews in China
Round Eyes in the Middle Kingdom – a documentary about Israel Epstein

References

 Adapted from the Wikinfo article "Israel Epstein" 2 June 2005

Sources and external links
New York Times Obituary by Douglas Martin
Obituary People's Daily Online
Retrospective, China Today
Biography by China Tibet Information Center
Xinhua Newsitem on funeral
Views of a life in China, China.org.cn

1915 births
2005 deaths
People's Republic of China journalists
People's Republic of China writers
Chinese people of Polish-Jewish descent
Emigrants from the Russian Empire to China
Jewish Chinese history
Chinese Communist Party politicians
Members of the Standing Committee of the 6th Chinese People's Political Consultative Conference
Members of the Standing Committee of the 7th Chinese People's Political Consultative Conference
Members of the Standing Committee of the 8th Chinese People's Political Consultative Conference
Members of the Standing Committee of the 9th Chinese People's Political Consultative Conference
Members of the Standing Committee of the 10th Chinese People's Political Consultative Conference
Naturalized citizens of the People's Republic of China
Burials at Babaoshan Revolutionary Cemetery